The CT-1 parachute is a personnel parachute deployed by the Canadian Army during the latter half of the 20th century. The CT-1 was a tweak of the T-10 parachute for Canadian purposes, and its profile while deployed is similar to the American model.

References

Military equipment of Canada
Military parachutes